Schachten is a German word for a type of pasture. 

Schacten may also refer to:

Places in Germany 
 Schachten (Arnstorf), village in the market borough of Arnstorf, Rottal-Inn, Bavaria
 , village in the borough of Grebenstein, Kassel, Hesse
 , a listed manor estate in the Grebenstein village of Schachten

People 
 Sebastian Schachten (born 1984), German footballer
 Werner Schachten (born 1954), German footballer

See also 
 Schacht (disambiguation)